The Haiti national under-20 football team represents Haiti in international football at this age level and is controlled by the Fédération Haïtienne de Football (FHF).

Competitive record

FIFA U-20 World Cup

CONCACAF Under-20 Championship

Central American and Caribbean Games

Jeux de la Francophonie

Current squad
 The following players were called up for the 2022 CONCACAF U-20 Championship.
 Match dates: 18 June – 3 July 2022
 Caps and goals correct as of: 19 June 2022
 Names in italics denote players who have been capped for the senior team.

HonoursMinor competitionsCentral American and Caribbean Games  Fourth place (2): 2002, 2018CFU Under-20 ChampionshipWinners (1): 2016
Runner-up (1): 2014Friendly competitionsCopa de Las AntillasCopa de Las Antillas (U20) 2001Winners (1):''' 2005
Runner-up (1): 2001

See also
 
Haiti national football team
Haiti national under-15 football team
Haiti national under-17 football team
Haiti national under-23 football team

References

u20
Haiti